Persikapro stand for Persatuan Sepakbola Kabupaten Probolinggo (en: Football Association of Probolinggo Regency). Persikapro Probolinggo is an Indonesian football club based in Probolinggo Regency, East Java. Club played in Liga 3.

References

External links
Liga-Indonesia.co.id
 

Football clubs in Indonesia
Football clubs in East Java